Felix Viktorovich Tsarikati (Ossetian: Цæрикъати Виктори фурт Феликс; born September 13, 1964, Nalchik, Kabardino-Balkaria) is a Soviet and Russian pop singer (baritone) and an actor of Ossetian origin. Honored Artist of Russia (2000).

Biography
Born September 13, 1964 in Nalchik in the Ossetian family. He was invited to the Bolshoi Theater, as a graduate of Pokrovsky, but refused. His first appearance on the professional stage took place in 1991. Felix is one of the participants of the contest of young performers Jurmala-89, a diploma of the festival Yalta-91, where he won the audience prize, laureate of the  Crystal Dolphin Festival (1992). In the same year, 1991, his debut album, entitled  The Loud, was released, the first tours in Ossetia took place. Among other things, Felix performed at the art vernissage in Frankfurt (1992) and at the festival of the Days of Russian Culture in Kenya (1997).

In 1993 the main role in the film  The Legend of Mount Tbau; In fulfilling this role, Felix nearly died on filming while performing cinematic tricks. In 2006 he performed the soundtrack for the film  Break-through.

Performed by the anthem of the Republic of North Ossetia - Alania.

Personal life
In the early 1990s, his nephew Felix called the famous businessman Otari Kvantrishvili, but in fact they were not relatives and Kvantrishvili only helped Tsarikati in advancing his career.

He is married. Has two daughters.

Discography 
Incomprehensible (1991)
Oh, These Legs (1996)
 Nothing is forgotten (1997)
 Do Not Let Me Go, Mom! (1998)
Old Forgotten Waltz (2000)
Tell Me: Yes, Yes, Yes! (2001)
Names for All Seasons (2005)
The Best Songs (2012)

References

External links
 Official Website
 Обычный день Феликса Царикати

1964 births
Living people
Musicians  from Nalchik
20th-century Russian male singers
20th-century Russian singers
Russian bass-baritones
Honored Artists of the Russian Federation
Russian male actors
Ossetian people
Russian Academy of Theatre Arts alumni
21st-century Russian male singers
21st-century Russian singers